Monsieur Scrupule, Gangster (French: Monsieur Scrupule gangster) is a 1953 French crime film directed by Jacques Daroy and starring Tilda Thamar,  Yves Vincent and Howard Vernon.

Cast
 Tilda Thamar as Rolande  
 Yves Vincent as M. Scrupule  
 Howard Vernon as L'ami de Rolande

References

Bibliography 
 Rège, Philippe. Encyclopedia of French Film Directors, Volume 1. Scarecrow Press, 2009.

External links 
 

1953 films
French crime films
1953 crime films
1950s French-language films
Films directed by Jacques Daroy
French black-and-white films
1950s French films